Kovvali was a popular novelist of Telugu language in the early 20th century. He is one of the most prolific writer of modern Telugu language.  His full name is Kovvali Lakshmi Narasimha Rao (1912–1975), born in Tanuku. He wrote about thousand Novels, which is a record not surpassed by any Telugu writer till now. Though they are not of high standard, they are very popular with public and known as "Railway Literature".

The period from 1935 to 1975, when Romantic movement was fading, the Progressive movement was on the rise. Women were slowly gathering up the guts to read something new about the love, sexuality and freedom. His novels had the distinction of being banned from "respectable" households, because they gave "ugly and unhealthy ideas" to the women. He wrote them with short intervals, about one novel a week; some in just two days. Book vendors would get into trains with bundles of magazines and short novels. These novels, a quarter-size of foolscap paper, were sold thick and fast as Kovvali novels had a big clientele.

He was a person of social awareness and a champion of women's causes. He asked women to get educated, not hang on to an unhappy marriage, get out of child marriage, not hesitate to marry for love. His female characters always fight to get it. His solutions for the problems of women may have been simplistic, sometimes even cinematic. But the intentions were true and sincere. He was expressively against hypocrisy, blind faith in the name of tradition, greed and corruption.

Some of his novels were adapted for movies in Telugu cinema. D.L. Narayana's production Sipayi Kooturu in 1959,' was the screen version of a Kovvali novel.

Recently, 18 of his novels are published as compilation in 2009 as "Kovvali Navalalu Konni" by Acharya Kottapalli Veerabhadra Rao.

He died in 1975 in Draksharama. He has two sons named Nageswara Rao and Lakshmi Narayana.

References

Telugu writers
Indian male novelists
1912 births
1975 deaths
20th-century Indian novelists
Novelists from Andhra Pradesh
20th-century Indian male writers